Consort Hwang (黄妃; 1401–1421), was a consort of the Yongle Emperor.  

She was from Korea, and became a member of the imperial harem of the Yongle Emperor in 1409. She was sent unwillingly to the harem. Upon her arrival, she was interrogated and admitted not to be a virgin and to have had two lovers, one her brother-in-law. She was still not allowed to leave the harem, however. In 1421, she was one of the many concubines who were accused for having participated in a conspiracy to murder the emperor. She was arrested and interrogated.  She was executed for attempted murder of the emperor.

References 

14th-century births
1421 deaths
Consorts of the Yongle Emperor